The Boleyn Inheritance is a novel by British author Philippa Gregory which was first published in 2006. It is a direct sequel to her previous novel The Other Boleyn Girl, and one of the additions to her six-part series on the Tudor royals. (The other titles in the series are The Constant Princess, The Queen's Fool, The Virgin's Lover, and The Other Queen.)* The novel is told through the first-person narratives of – Anne of Cleves, Katherine Howard, and Jane Boleyn, who was mentioned in The Other Boleyn Girl. It covers a period from 1539 until 1542 and chronicles the fourth and fifth marriages of King Henry VIII of England.

Plot summary 

The book begins in 1539, after the death of King Henry VIII's third wife, Jane Seymour. Henry is looking for a new wife and chooses Anne of Cleves, daughter of John III, Duke of Cleves, whom he has only seen from portraits sent to him by her brother, a minor duke.

Jane Rochford is summoned to court by the Duke of Norfolk to be a lady-in-waiting at the court of King Henry VIII. Jane has unpleasant memories of court, because she is the widow of George Boleyn and sister-in-law to Henry VIII's second wife, Anne. George and Anne Boleyn were both executed in 1536 for "adultery, incest and plotting to murder the King."

Katherine Howard is a fourteen-year-old girl (the cousin of Anne Boleyn) living with her grandmother at Lambeth Palace, where she has grown accustomed to a lax, licentious lifestyle. She has taken a lover, Francis Dereham, and the two have sworn to be married. Katherine's uncle informs her that she will go to court if she can behave herself and she swears to herself not to let anything, including Francis, get in her way of success of the throne.

Anne, who has heard of the fates of her predecessors, is not sure about being the queen of England but is eager to leave her family, as nobody really cares for her. Her arrival in England goes well until she is surprised by a drunken man (actually Henry VIII in disguise), who plants a sloppy kiss on her; she responds with an angry shove and curses him in German. Although she tries to make amends once she is aware of his identity, the King holds a grudge for the duration of their marriage because of this. Henry is also put off by Anne's looks, since her German style of dress is bulky and unflattering, and she physically seems to appear nothing like her portrait. Despite his misgivings, Henry goes ahead with the marriage, but he is already looking for a way out. Anne is at a great disadvantage during the first months of her new life as she hardly speaks any English or Latin, the diplomatic language of the time. Due to her strict religious upbringing, she has not been taught how to play an instrument, sing or dance, and her mother has not made her aware of the facts of life. Despite this, Anne quickly befriends Jane Rochford, who is one of her ladies-in-waiting. Jane is as surprised as anyone at Anne's plain appearance and ill proficiency at English, but Anne is an honest, sweet young woman who wins over the English people, if not her husband. She makes an effort to befriend Prince Edward, and the princesses Elizabeth and Mary, even when it enrages her husband, and makes a point to learn as much English as possible. A few months after their wedding, Henry decides to rid himself of his new wife. Fearing for her life, Anne agrees to sign an annulment saying that she was previously betrothed to Francis of Lorraine and that her wedding was not consummated. She is given the title "Princess" and receives land, money, and the treatment reserved for the king's own sister.

Meanwhile, Henry has noticed the beautiful fourteen-year-old Katherine "Kitty" Howard, who has becomes one of the queen's ladies-in-waiting, thanks to her uncle, Thomas Howard, Duke of Norfolk. Infatuated, Henry quickly divorces Anne and marries Katherine, his "rose without a thorn". Katherine has, in turn, fallen in love with one of the king's favourite courtiers, Thomas Culpepper. At first, Katherine enjoys the perks of being a queen but finds the condescension of her stepdaughter, Mary, irritating. (Mary is almost ten years older than she is and finds her frivolous). However, she quickly becomes aware of the drawbacks of being married to the King. Henry is no longer young and handsome; he is nearly 50 years old (her grandfather's age), weighs approximately 300 pounds, and has a festering ulcer on his thigh that permanently weeps pus and blood. Katherine's infatuation for Thomas Culpepper becomes harder and harder to hide. Encouraged by the Duke of Norfolk and Jane Rochford, who want Katherine to bear a child for the king (whom they now believe to be completely impotent), she begins an affair with the young courtier.

However, young Katherine's life goes wrong when her past returns to haunt her in the shape of her former betrothed Francis Dereham, who arrives, sent by her grandmother, who asks that he be given a post in her household. She agrees but does not like him being so close. When her affair with Culpepper is exposed by her family's enemies, her friends and family desert her to avoid being implicated too and her previous affairs are used as further evidence of adultery (which is now a treasonous offence). Although Thomas Cranmer, the Archbishop of Canterbury, tries to help her by telling her to confess that she was engaged to Dereham, making her marriage invalid. Katherine is now so frightened and hysterical that she cannot understand him and continues to state that there was no engagement. She is found guilty of adultery and treason and is executed at only sixteen, along with her beloved Thomas Culpepper and Francis Dereham. Jane tries desperately to get out of execution by feigning insanity but cannot escape the king's wrath this time. Henry changes the law so that anyone guilty of treason can be executed, mad or not. Jane is found guilty and is beheaded along with Katherine. Anne of Cleves, after being cleared of any blame, remains in her new home in England and outlives not only her supplanter, but Henry himself.

Reception
In reviewing the book, Publishers Weekly wrote "Gregory's accounts of events are accurate enough to be persuasive, her characterizations modern enough to be convincing. Rich in intrigue and irony, this is a tale where readers will already know who was divorced, beheaded or survived, but will savor Gregory's sharp staging of how and why." The Historical Novel Society review summarized the book as "Beautifully drawn characters, glorious storytelling – a tour de force from Philippa Gregory and a must read."

In a 2006 book review in Kirkus Reviews the review summarized; "Royal history spoon-fed in a highly digestible form."

Historical inaccuracies

 Mary Boleyn's daughter, Catherine, is referred to as Catherine Carey throughout the book. However, she married Francis Knollys in 1539 and would have been called Lady Catherine Knollys.
 There is no evidence that Jane faked insanity to save her life. She was, however, insane when she was executed, and King Henry VIII repealed a law that said that insane people could not be executed.
 Jane and George Boleyn did not have a son. There is no contemporary mention of them having children. That rumour comes from the later prominence of George Boleyn, the dean of Lichfield, who was probably a distant cousin. If they had had a son, he would have inherited the titles of Earl of Ormonde and Earl of Wiltshire. Instead, the inheritance went to the crown since there were no male heirs left from Thomas and Elizabeth Boleyn, and Henry passed the funds along to Mary Boleyn.
 In the book, when Jane Boleyn returns to the Queen's service she mentions being at Greenwich Palace and the last occasion she was there was when she nursed the dying Jane Seymour. Jane Seymour, in fact, died at Hampton Court. Her son, the future Edward VI, died at Greenwich fifteen years later.
 In the novel, once Katherine Howard is told by her uncle that she is to be sent to court, she promptly ends her affair with Francis Dereham and finds her desire to go is apparently stronger than her love for him. When he comes to her that night, she orders him away. Francis Dereham was not really in the same place as Katherine Howard when she was given the opportunity to go to court. He was away travelling and was not informed of her absence at the home of the dowager duchess until after his return.
 In the book, Jane and the Duke of Norfolk plot to put Katherine on the throne. However, there is no evidence that they even talked after the fall of Anne Boleyn. The Duke of Norfolk, after the tragedy of his niece, Anne Boleyn, is highly unlikely to have played such a dangerous game.
 Anne of Cleves's mother was not cruel to her. On the contrary, Anne was said to be her favourite.
 In the novel, Jane is said to be 30 in 1539, meaning she would have to have been born sometime in 1509. However, it is more likely that she was born in 1505 and so was 34 in 1539.
 In the book, Katherine Howard was said to be extremely beautiful, and as she herself says, that she "was the most beautiful girl in England"). In reality, Katherine Howard was said to be only "moderately beautiful" but youthful looking.
 In the book, Katherine Howard is 14 when she comes to court. Although her exact date of birth is not known, the most common date given is 1521, and she would actually have been in her late teens when she came to court.
 In the book, Anne of Cleves is elated to be free from her marriage and is horrified at the idea of remarrying the King. In reality, she agreed to the annulment, but she had hopes of becoming Queen again after the execution of Katherine Howard and was said to be quite unhappy on learning that the King was marrying Katherine Parr. Years after the King died, she attempted to have their marriage declared valid so that she could enjoy the advantages of being Queen Dowager.
 In the book, Henry's eldest daughter Mary I of England is openly referred to as Princess Mary, but in reality, she was then legally illegitimate and addressed as Lady Mary. His younger daughter Elizabeth, likewise, was not restored to the line of succession until after the king's sixth wife, Katherine Parr, persuaded him to reinstate both of his daughters in the line of succession, but both Mary and Elizabeth remained legally illegitimate. Henry's daughters never regained their titles of princess.
 It is unlikely that Anne of Cleves met Henry's younger daughter Elizabeth during their marriage, as is portrayed in the novel.
 There are frequent mentions to Anne Boyelyn putting her head on the executioner's block when many sources state that she did not know that the swordsman had swung his sword; he devised it so that she would not know so that he could have a cleaner cut.
 Katherine calls the motto 'The most happy' Jane Seymour's, but it was Anne Boleyn who adapted it in 1533 when she was finally married to the king and pregnant. Jane's motto was 'Bound to obey and serve.'

References

External links
 The Official Philippa Gregory Site
 
 

2006 British novels
Novels set in Tudor England
Novels by Philippa Gregory
Anne of Cleves
Catherine Howard